Video Nasties: Moral Panic, Censorship & Videotape is a 2010 documentary about the Video Nasties controversy of the early 1980s.
It was premiered at London FrightFest in August 2010 and followed by a panel discussion which included producer Marc Morris and director Jake West of Nucleus Films, professor Martin Barker and film director Tobe Hooper. 
In 2014 the documentary was followed by Video Nasties: Draconian Days, which covered the period from 1984 to 1989 after the introduction of the Video Recordings Act 1984.  
The two documentaries have contributed to a greater understanding of the Video Nasties phenomenon, and the box sets include archive material, trailers, and analysis from a range of academics, actors and journalists, including CP Lee, Stephen Thrower, Brad Stevens, Julian Petley, Xavier Mendik, Patricia MacCormack. Allan Bryce, Emily Booth.

References

External links

 Box Set 1 Trailer
 Box set 2 Trailer
 IMDb: 'Video Nasties the Complete 72 Banned Titles'

2010 films
Documentary films about films
Film censorship in the United Kingdom
Films directed by Jake West
British documentary films
2010s English-language films
2010s British films